Gogu Tonca (2 May 1947 – 23 October 2010) was a Romanian footballer who played as a central defender and a manager.

Career
Gogu Tonca was born on 2 May 1947 in Bucharest and started practicing boxing before reorienting towards football at the junior squads of Steaua București. In 1966 he made his Divizia A debut under coach Ștefan Coidum in a 1–0 loss against Dinamo București. After playing in the first seasons at Jiul Petroșani as a right or left defender, Tonca started to play alongside Andrei Stocker in the central defense, where they became known for their tough way of playing, being considered by some as the most aggressive couple of defenders in Divizia A's history. Tonca in particular was known for his way of approaching his opponents before the start of home games, by going at them and telling them to not be so ambitious in their play if they don't want to be tackled hard, as he has four kids who are waiting for him at home and he needs to win the game and receive the victory money in order to provide for them. He appeared in 176 Divizia A matches for Jiul, played two Cupa României finals, winning one and made two appearances in the double against Dundee United in the 1974–75 European Cup Winners' Cup in which he scored a goal in the 2–0 home victory of the second leg as the team lost with 3–2 on aggregate. In 1976, Tonca went to play for one year at Divizia A team Corvinul Hunedoara, moving in 1977 at Minerul Lupeni in Divizia B where he ended his playing career.

After he retired from his playing career, Tonca started working as an assistant for his former teammate, Petre Libardi at Jiul Petroșani, shortly after he became head coach of the team and he also coached Minerul Lupeni. His nephew, Andrei Tonca was also a footballer who played as a goalkeeper for Jiul Petroșani, among other teams. Gogu Tonca died on 23 October 2010.

Honours
Jiul Petroșani
Cupa României: 1973–74, runner-up 1971–72

References

1947 births
2010 deaths
Romanian footballers
Association football defenders
Liga I players
Liga II players
CSM Jiul Petroșani players
CS Corvinul Hunedoara players
CS Minerul Lupeni players
Romanian football managers
CSM Jiul Petroșani managers
Footballers from Bucharest